Erwin Hoffstätter (12 February 1897 – 21 August 1971) was a German rower. He competed in the men's eight event at the 1928 Summer Olympics.

References

1897 births
1971 deaths
German male rowers
Olympic rowers of Germany
Rowers at the 1928 Summer Olympics
Sportspeople from Mannheim